is a railway station on the Seibu Ikebukuro Line in Nerima, Tokyo, Japan, operated by the private railway operator Seibu Railway.

Lines

Station layout
The station has one ground-level island platform, serving two tracks.

The station is located close to the home of Leiji Matsumoto, the creator of the anime Galaxy Express 999, and includes a statue of the Conductor from the series. From 2009, the station departure melody was changed to the Galaxy Express 999 theme tune.

Platforms

History

Station numbering was introduced on all Seibu Railway lines during fiscal 2012, with Ōizumi-gakuen Station becoming "SI11".

Passenger statistics
In fiscal 2013, the station was the 8th busiest on the Seibu network with an average of 84,006 passengers daily.

The passenger figures for previous years are as shown below.

Surrounding area

 Ōizumi Gakuen Yumeria Hall, Shop, and Tower
 Toei Tokyo Film & Animation Studios
 High School Ōizumi (associated with Tokyo Gakugei University)
 Ōizumi Metropolitan High School

References

External links

 Ōizumi-gakuen Station information (Seibu Railway) 

Seibu Ikebukuro Line
Stations of Seibu Railway
Railway stations in Japan opened in 1924
Railway stations in Tokyo